Peter Tessier may refer to:
 Peter M Tessier, biochemical engineer
 Peter G. Tessier (1819–1886), English-born merchant and politician in Newfoundland